Agabus affinis is a species of beetle native to the Palearctic (including Europe) and the Near East. In Europe, it is only found in Austria, Belarus, Belgium, Great Britain including Shetland, Orkney, Hebrides and Isle of Man, Croatia, the Czech Republic, mainland Danmark, Estonia, Finland, mainland France, Germany, Hungary, the Republic of Ireland, mainland Italy, Kaliningrad, Latvia, Lithuania, Northern Ireland, mainland Norway, Poland, Russia except the South, Slovakia, Sweden, Switzerland, the Netherlands, Ukraine, and Italy.

External links

Agabus affinis at Fauna Europaea

Agabus (beetle)
Beetles described in 1798
Beetles of Europe